The Candelariales are an order of fungi in the monotypic class Candelariomycetes. It contains the families Candelariaceae and Pycnoraceae. The order was circumscribed by Jolanta Miadlikowska, François Lutzoni, and Helge Thorsten Lumbsch as part of a comprehensive phylogenetic classification of the kingdom Fungi published in 2007. The class Candelariomycetes was created in 2018 by Hermann Voglmayr and Walter Jaklitsch.

References

Candelariales
Ascomycota orders
Lichen orders
Taxa described in 2007
Taxa named by Helge Thorsten Lumbsch